Seo Sang-ryun (1848–1926), along with his brother Seo Sang-u, founded the first Protestant church in Korea in 1884.  It was established in the village of Sorae, Hwanghae province, where his uncle lived.

Seo Sang-ryun was involved in the trade of ginseng in Manchuria and fell ill, coming close to death.  He would be nursed back to health by the Scottish Protestant missionary John Macintyre and baptized by John Ross.  Seo would later assist Ross in the translation of the gospel of Luke, helping to produce the first translation of the Bible into Korean.

See also 
 John Ross
 Korean Bible

References 

Korean Presbyterians
1848 births
1926 deaths
Joseon Christians
19th-century Korean people